Chen Kue-sen (born 30 June 1947) is a Taiwanese weightlifter. He competed at the 1968 Summer Olympics and the 1972 Summer Olympics.

References

1947 births
Living people
Taiwanese male weightlifters
Olympic weightlifters of Taiwan
Weightlifters at the 1968 Summer Olympics
Weightlifters at the 1972 Summer Olympics
Place of birth missing (living people)
20th-century Taiwanese people